Moossee (or Grosser Moossee) is a lake in the Canton of Berne, Switzerland. The lake gives the name to Moosseedorf (literally "village of Moossee") on its southern shore. The golf course Moossee is located east of the lake at Münchenbuchsee. The Urtenen drains Chli Moossee before flowing into Grosser Moossee 400 m further.

See also
List of lakes of Switzerland

Moos
Lakes of the canton of Bern
LMoosee